Chloë Turblin (born 19 September 1995) is a French professional racing cyclist, who currently rides for French amateur team Velcan Racing Team.

References

External links

1995 births
Living people
French female cyclists
Place of birth missing (living people)
20th-century French women
21st-century French women